Reuter Dyer House is a historic home and farm complex located at Cape Vincent in Jefferson County, New York.  The limestone farmhouse was built about 1839 and has three sections: a -story, three-bay main block; a 1-story side wing; and a 1-story wooden ell projecting from the wing.  Also on the property are two 19th-century barns.

It was listed on the National Register of Historic Places in 1985.

References

Houses on the National Register of Historic Places in New York (state)
Houses completed in 1839
Houses in Jefferson County, New York
National Register of Historic Places in Jefferson County, New York